South East Essex was a parliamentary constituency in  Essex in the East of England.  It returned one Member of Parliament (MP)  to the House of Commons of the Parliament of the United Kingdom.

History 
South East Essex (formally the South Eastern division of Essex in its first incarnation) was one of eight single-member divisions of Essex (later classified as county constituencies) created by the Redistribution of Seats Act 1885, replacing the three two member divisions of East, South and West Essex.

The seat was reduced considerably in size under the Representation of the People Act 1918 and again in the interim redistribution carried out for the 1945 general election, before being abolished for the 1950 general election.

The constituency was re-established for the 1955 general election, and abolished again for the 1983 general election.

Boundaries

1885–1918: The Sessional Divisions of Dengie, Orsett, and Rochford, and the civil parishes of Rainham and Wennington.

Formed primarily from the abolished South Division of Essex, together with southern part of the abolished East Division (Dengie peninsular). See below for areas covered.

1918–1945: The Urban Districts of Grays Thurrock, Shoeburyness, and Tilbury, the Rural Districts of Orsett and Rochford, and part of the Rural District of Billericay.

Gained southernmost parts of Chelmsford Division of Essex, including Billericay.  Area between River Crouch and River Blackwater (Dengie peninsular), including Burnham-on-Crouch, transferred to Maldon and westernmost area, including Rainham, transferred to Romford.  Parts comprising Southend-on-Sea County Borough created as a separate Parliamentary Borough.

1945–1950: The Urban Districts of Benfleet, Billericay, Canvey Island, and Rayleigh, the Rural District of Rochford, and part of the County Borough of Southend-on-Sea.

The House of Commons (Redistribution of Seats) Act 1944 set up Boundaries Commissions to carry out periodic reviews of the distribution of parliamentary constituencies. It also authorised an initial review to subdivide abnormally large constituencies in time for the 1945 election. This was implemented by the Redistribution of Seats Order 1945 under which South East Essex was divided into two constituencies.  As a consequence, the Urban District of Thurrock (created largely from amalgamating the Urban Districts of Grays Thurrock and Tilbury and the Rural District of Orsett) was formed as the new Thurrock Division of Essex.  Other marginal changes resulting from changes to local authority boundaries.

Following the First Periodic Review of Westminster constituencies the seat was abolished. The bulk of the Division, comprising the Urban Districts of Benfleet, Billericay, Canvey Island and Rayleigh, formed the new County Constituency of Billericay.  The Rural District of Rochford, and the parts of the County Borough of Southend-on-Sea situated in the Division (Shoeburyness), included in the new Borough Constituency of Southend East.

1955–1974: The Urban Districts of Benfleet, Canvey Island, and Rayleigh, and the Rural District of Rochford.

Re-established as a County Constituency. Benfleet, Canvey Island and Rayleigh were transferred back from Billericay, and Rochford from Southend East.

1974–1983: The Urban Districts of Benfleet, Canvey Island, and Rayleigh.

The Rural District of Rochford was now transferred to Maldon.

On abolition for the second time, Benfleet and Canvey Island (which now comprised the District of Castle Point) formed the new Borough Constituency of Castle Point. Rayleigh had been incorporated into the District of Rochford and was included in the new County Constituency thereof.

Areas covered

Members of Parliament

MPs 1885–1950

MPs 1955–1983

Elections

Elections in the 1880s

Elections in the 1890s

Elections in the 1900s

Elections in the 1910s 

General Election 1914–15:

Another General Election was required to take place before the end of 1915. The political parties had been making preparations for an election to take place and by July 1914, the following candidates had been selected; 
Unionist: Rupert Guinness
Liberal:

Elections in the 1920s

Elections in the 1930s

Elections in the 1940s

Elections in the 1950s

Elections in the 1960s

Elections in the 1970s

References

Parliamentary constituencies in Essex (historic)
Constituencies of the Parliament of the United Kingdom established in 1885
Constituencies of the Parliament of the United Kingdom disestablished in 1950
Constituencies of the Parliament of the United Kingdom established in 1955
Constituencies of the Parliament of the United Kingdom disestablished in 1983